Taringa sublutea is a species of sea slug, a dorid nudibranch, shell-less marine gastropod mollusks in the family Discodorididae.

Distribution
This species was described from Trincomalee, Sri Lanka, (Ceylon). It has been reported from Madagascar, Réunion, Oman and Socotra Island.

References

Discodorididae
Gastropods described in 1858